The Residency may refer to:
The Residency, Alice Springs, the former administrative centre of Northern Territory, Australia
The name of official residences in the British Empire
The Residency, Penang, the official residence of the governor of Penang, Malaysia
The Residency, Lucknow, a group of buildings in Lucknow, Uttar Pradesh, India
The official residence of the Government Agent who was the head of the district in colonial and post colonial Sri Lanka

See also
Government House
State House (disambiguation)
Residency (disambiguation)